Jaime Reyes is a goofy-footed American skateboarder from Hawaii. Reyes is a pioneer in women's street skating. As of 2020, Reyes is one of only three women to grace the cover of Thrasher Magazine.

Skateboarding

Early life 
Growing up in Hawaii in the early 1990s, Reyes was an avid surfer. At age 13, Reyes cut class one day to go to the beach to surf; however, there were no waves, so Reyes wandered around and ran into a group of skateboarders. Amazed by the skateboarding, Reyes befriended the skaters. She rode a skateboard for the first time that day.

Skateboarding career 
Reyes' first competition was hosted by the Real skateboard team at A'Ala Park. Reyes, the only girl at the event, won first place for her age group. After the event, Real began flowing Reyes boards. During her early competitive career, Reyes was often one of few women competing alongside Elissa Steamer and Lauren Mollica.

Reyes got the cover of Thrasher in April 1994. In the years that came, Reyes obtained many nationwide sponsorship deals throughout her career including Real Skateboards, Alphanumeric, Rookie, Evian Water, Bones Swiss Bearings, Supreme, In4mation, Globe and Venture.

In 2019, Reyes released a signature deck with the skate company Together Together. The “chosen ohana” model features artwork by Mark Oblow.

Thrasher magazine cover 
Jaime Reyes graced the cover of the April 1994 issue of Thrasher magazine. She is currently one of only three women, alongside Cara-Beth Burnside and Lizzie Armanto, with a “Thrasher” cover and the only one pictured skating street. The cover was her first time being publish in a skate magazine. Jim Thiebaud, Tommy Guerrero, and Ruben Orkin set her up with a photographer. Reyes cut class to shoot with the photographer. Two months later, the photo was published on the cover of Thrasher. A copy of her cover is in the Smithsonian National Museum of American History collection.

Skate Video Parts

Coaching 
Reyes works with Max Pfannebecker and Triangle Skateboard Alliance teaching young children how to skateboard. Reyes has been a visiting professional at Camp Woodward in Pennsylvania.

References

External links
NY Skateboarding - FULL PART: JAIME REYES RETROSPECTIVE (1993 – 2009)
Jaime Reyes - IMDB profile

Living people
American skateboarders
Female skateboarders
American sportswomen
Year of birth missing (living people)
21st-century American women